Haaler Au is a river in Schleswig-Holstein, Germany. Before the building of the Kiel Canal the Haaler Au was a tributary of the Eider. The Kiel Canal cut the old river bed, now the Haaler Au ends at the Kiel Canal. Shortly before the Canal the river forms a lake.

The usage of canoes and rowboats is possible on the lower part of the river.

See also
List of rivers of Schleswig-Holstein

Rivers of Schleswig-Holstein
Rivers of Germany